Marko Stojanović (January 2, 1971, Belgrade) is a Serbian celebrity, theatre and TV actor and comedian, renown mime artist, and university professor, director, humanitarian and sports worker. He is the co-founder and the president of the World Mime Organisation.

During the COVID-19 pandemic he started a global online initiative #artistsagainstcorona and its localised Serbian language version #umetniciprotivkorone on March 16, 2020, with the support of the World Mime Organisation. The initiative was accepted immediately, mostly on Facebook and many localisations were made.

Biography 
He was an acting director of the Belgrade Youth Center from 2013 to 2015, and he is one of the founders together with Israeli mime artists Ofer Blum and president of the "World Mime Organisation" and the president of the "National Curling Association of Serbia". He was a Senior Lecturer for the subjects of Acting and the Stage Movement and Head of the Acting Department of the Academy of Fine Arts in Belgrade, and now he is an associate professor for the subject Stage Movement at the Acting Department of the Sinergija University in Bijeljina, Republic of Srpska, and a visiting lecturer of Communication Skills at Singidunum University in Belgrade, Serbia.

Education 
Marko was accepted at the age of 16 at the Faculty of Dramatic Arts, Acting Department, in 1987 and acquired a Bachelor of Arts degree in acting in 1991. In 1989 he was selected to participate in a three-week student exchange program in Leningrad State Institute of Theatre, Music and Cinema, Leningrad, USSR (now St. Petersburg, Russia). 
A year later (1990) he was part of a ten student delegation of the Faculty of Dramatic Arts in Belgrade that received a fellowship from the US Government for an eight weeks "Arts Management" study program at the University of South Carolina and a one-week professional course in film directing at the South Carolina Media Arts Institute, in Columbia, South Carolina, United States.
In 1991 he was accepted and offered a full one-year scholarship at the Paris Marcel Marceau’s International School of Mime for a year long professional skills improvement.
In 1992 - 1993, he was participating in a one year long professional course in film directing at "Mon Film a Moi", in Paris, France.

Career

Acting in Theatre

Filmography (Selected roles in film & TV)

Membership in organisations 

Marko Stojanović is member of several organisation, in the role of president, Member of the council, representative, or standard.member.
 International Visitor Leadership Program Alumni (US Department of State Bureau of Education and Cultural Affairs)
 President of the World Mime Organization
 President of the National Curling Association of Serbia
 Member of the International Theatre Institute Forum for Theatre Training & Education FTTE
 Member of the International Dance Council (CID-UNESCO)
 Member of the Board of Directors of the Crown Prince Alexander Foundation for Education
 National Representative to the World Curling Federation
 Former President of the Commission for Culture and Olympic Education of the National Olympic Committee of Serbia
 Former Member of the Council to the Mayor of Belgrade for People with Disabilities
 Former Non-voting member of the Presidium (Exec Board) of the National Olympic Committee of Serbia
 International coordinator of the Youth, Education and Culture Committee of the “Federation Internationale Cinema et Television Sportifs” (Federation recognized by the International Olympic Committee and based in Milan, Italy)
 Member of the Permanent Marketing and Communication Committee of the “Federation Internationale Cinema et Television Sportifs” 
 Member of the Association of Dramatic Artists of Serbia
 President of the Balkan Curling Federation
 Member by invitation of the Public Relations Society of Serbia
 National Representative to the European Curling Federation
 Former Member of the National Committee for Smoking Prevention of the Ministry of Health of the Republic of Serbia 
 Former Member of the Managing Board of the “Always with Children” Charity (Anti Pediatric Cancer Organization)
 Former member of the charity organization “The Dream Board”

Awards 
Marko Stojanović received over 30 domestic and international awards and recognitions, including:

 2015 “Ambassador of Serbia” for congress tourism by the National Congress Bureau of Serbia of the Tourist Organization of Serbia for outstanding organization of the 4th World Curling Congress in Belgrade, Serbia
 2015 "The Biomelem Company Award" for the support of the development of women's entrepreneurship through project “Serbian Soul Inclusive” and the support to the education of young people through the "School of Entrepreneurship"
 2014 "Award of the “My Hero” Association for the Contribution” of the informing of young people, promoting virtue and true values 
 2014 “Plaquette for the Outstanding Contribution to the Improvement of the Social Status and the Quality of Life of the Roma Population in the Republic of Serbia” by the Roma National Minority Council of Serbia on the occasion of the UN World Roma Day 
 2013 "Special Award for Creative Contribution to the Development of the Culture of Communication" by the Association for Marketing Communications of Serbia 
 2013 “Best Youth Theatre Play Award” by International Festival of children's and youth theater plays (DOPS), Jagodina
 2013 “Special Award” for the Contribution to the Development and Promotion of the Art of Mime in Serbia awarded by the Festival Council of the International Monodrama and Mime Festival in Zemun
 2010 ”The Star of Belgrade” awarded by the Agency for European Integrations and Cooperation with the NGO of the City of Belgrade to Marko Stojanovic as and aouthor of the “Music of Silence” project dealing with the social inclusion of deaf children through the art of mime 
 2010 ”Dragoslav Simic Diploma” at the 10th Festival of short stage plays for directing “The Tree of Life” a mime play with young deaf mime artists 
 2009 Special “Culture Through Sport” Award for organizing the First Belgrade International FICTS Sports Film Festival. Awarded by the Federation Internationale Cinema Television Sportifs
 2008 The International Olympic Committee “Sport and Youth” Trophy 2008 for promotion and development of sports and Olympic educational youth programmes. The IOC Trophy is given to the National Olympic Committees to be awarded to an individual or an institution of the NOC’s choice.
 2008 The Crystal Medal and Diploma “Guirland d’Honnour” for promoting of films about sport and people with disabilities and FICTS festival during the National celebration of the World Disability Day. Awarded by the Federation Internationale Cinema Television Sportifs
 2007 Special Prize and Diploma “Guirland d’Honnour” for directing a short film “Olympic Room” at the 25th International Sport Movies and TV Festival in Milan, Italy
 2007 Award for the Contribution to the Development of Sports of the City of Petrovac na Mlavi
 2004 Popularity Oscar for the comedy of the Year 2003
 2004 Melko Award for the best comedy in 2003
 1998 Two times winner of the Pink Grand Prix of The Radio Belgrade 202 for charity work
 1996 Yugoslav Best Actor Award for  "Girl With Matches", at the Yugoslav Children’s Theatre Festival, Kotor, Yugoslavia.
 1996 National Best Actor Award for “Girl With Matches", at the Serbian Puppet Theatre Festival, Zrenjanin, Yugoslavia.
 1996 Award for Achievements in Mime for “Girl With Matches", FESTIC Belgrade Children’s Theatre Festival, Belgrade, Yugoslavia
 1996 Bozidar Valtrovic Annual Award for “Girl With Matches", “Dusko Radovic” Theatre, Belgrade, Yugoslavia
 1991 Special Prize for “Bloody Sports” on the 19th International Monodrama and Pantomime Festival in Zemun, Yugoslavia.
 1991 Special Diploma for leading role in “Cabaret” on the 41st Festival of Professional Theatres in Zrenjanin, Yugoslavia
 1991 Best Play Award for “Barrister Pathelin”, on BAP Festival in Belgrade.
 1991 The Jankovic Sisters Award for Young Talents in Comedy, University of Arts, Faculty of Dramatic Arts Belgrade, Yugoslavia
 1990 The Jankovic Sisters Award for Young Talents in Comedy, University of Arts, Faculty of Dramatic Arts Belgrade, Yugoslavia

See also 

 World Mime Organisation
 World Mime Day
 National Curling Association of Serbia

References

External links 

 
 

Serbian male film actors
1971 births
Living people
Male actors from Belgrade
20th-century Serbian male actors
21st-century Serbian male actors
Serbian male television actors
Serbian mimes